Dolno Orizari may refer to:
 Dolno Orizari, Bitola, North Macedonia
 Dolno Orizari, Šuto Orizari, North Macedonia